HMAS Cairns is a Royal Australian Navy (RAN) base located adjacent to the Trinity Inlet on the shore of Trinity Bay in Cairns, Queensland, Australia. Although used regularly as a port-of-call since before World War II, a permanent RAN presence was not established until 1971, when a maintenance and support base for patrol boats was set up. The base was formally commissioned in 1971 as a minor war vessel base. The current commander of the base is Commander David Hannah, RAN.

HMAS Cairns is responsible for all Australian naval activity off north-eastern Australia, and is the home base for one Armidale class patrol boat, two Cape class patrol boats and the ships of the Royal Australian Navy Hydrographic Service.

History
The RAN had been using Cairns as a regular stop since before World War II, and during the war, Cairns was the principal port-of-call for many ships prior to heading to Pacific destinations. There was no official RAN presence in Cairns until 1971, when facilities for the maintenance of the RAN's patrol boats were established. In 1974, HMAS Cairns was commissioned as the parent establishment for patrol vessels and hydrographic ships based at Cairns.

In 2016, the Australian Government announced plans to significantly redevelop Cairns as northern Australia's key strategic naval base. The plans announced projected that the number of personnel would increase from 900 to 3,000 by 2020, via an 120 million injection over ten years.

In May 2021 the Australian Government further announced an upgrade to the base and its facilities to support the incoming Arafura-Class patrol vessels currently under construction.

Facilities and operational units
Cairns is currently responsible for all Australian naval activity from Rockhampton to Thursday Island and serves as a home base for one of the navy's nine Armidale class patrol boats and four Cape class patrol boats. The base also berths the RAN's entire hydrographic fleet, consisting of two Leeuwin class survey vessels and two Paluma class survey motor launches.

Ships stationed

See also
List of Royal Australian Navy bases

References

External links
 Official website

Buildings and structures in Cairns
Cairns
Military units and formations established in 1974
1974 establishments in Australia
Military buildings and structures in Queensland
Military installations in Queensland